Caloptilia sanguinella is a moth of the family Gracillariidae. It is known from California and Maine in the United States.

References

sanguinella
Moths of North America